The World Figure Skating Championships is an annual figure skating competition sanctioned by the International Skating Union in which figure skaters compete for the title of World Champion.

The 1955 competitions for men, ladies, pair skating, and ice dancing took place from February 15th to 18th in Vienna, Austria.

Results

Men

Judges:
 Oscar Madl 
 Donald H. Gilchrist 
 V. Koudelka 
 Gérard Rodrigues-Henriques 
 Adolf Walker 
 A. D. C. Cordon 
 Elemér Terták 
 J. Creux 
 R. Sackett

Ladies

Judges:
 Edwin Kucharz 
 Donald H. Gilchrist 
 Jozef Dedic 
 G. Rodrigues-Henriques 
 F. Händel 
 Pamela Davis 
 M. Verdi 
 J. Creux 
 A. Krunoy

Pairs

Judges:
 F. Wojtanowskyj 
 Donald H. Gilchrist 
 V. Koudelka 
 F. Händel 
 Mollie Phillips 
 Elemér Terták 
 M. Verdi 
 J. Creux 
 A. Krunoy

Ice dancing

Judges:
 Hans Meixner 
 A. Voordeckers 
 Henri Meudec 
 P. L. Borrajo 
 László Szollás 
 P. Farinet 
 R. Sackett

Sources
 Result List provided by the ISU

World Figure Skating Championships
World Figure Skating Championships
World Figure Skating Championships
International figure skating competitions hosted by Austria
Sports competitions in Vienna
1950s in Vienna
February 1955 sports events in Europe